Reza Sadr is an Iranian politician who served in the  interim government of Bazargan and the cabinet of Revolutionary Council as the minister of commerce.

He came from a family with a clerical background and studied chemistry, as well as business administration. Sadr was editor-in-chief of Mizan newspaper, the official organ of the Freedom Movement of Iran.

References

Living people
1932 births
Freedom Movement of Iran politicians
Government ministers of Iran
Members of the Association for Defense of Freedom and the Sovereignty of the Iranian Nation